The Miami University Marching Band (MUMB) is the marching band of Miami University in Oxford, Ohio. Founded in 1935,
the band is an organization which fields 270 students enrolled in the Miami University system. The band is a part of the College of Creative Arts and the Department of Music, representing the students of the college at all home football games, as well as at various away games, bowl games, parades, and marching band festivals.

History
The Miami University Marching Band was formed in 1935 by A.D. Lekvold, the first director of bands from 1936 to 1960. Their first uniforms consisted of white trousers, red capes, and red coats. During the 1950s, the band fielded 96 members and would take annual road trips to Bowling Green State University, Ohio University, and the University of Cincinnati. Additionally, around this time the Shakerettes, drill team, and majorettes first appeared.

Under Nicholas Poccia, the band was enlarged from 96 to 144 students. Over 200 people were involved as either a field marcher or an alternate.

The late 60's brought the marching band new uniforms consisting of blue uniforms with a big 'M' on the front and an Indian on the back. In 1971, the Miami Marching Machine came into existence. The Marching Machine was built by Kappa Kappa Psi and Tau Beta Sigma, and was a birthday gift to Mr. Poccia from the marching band. The Marching Machine was a tank-like structure placed over Dr. Clay, the Tuba instructor's, Volkswagen, and it became the mascot of the band. It was always at the head of all the parades and even made an appearance at a Cincinnati Bengals game. The Marching Machine remained an integral part of the marching band until 1979.

In 1978, Dr. Jack Liles became director of the band. Dr. Liles made a significant impact on the style of marching the band would use. MUMB adapted the current drum corps style, in contrast to the prior dance style of marching. The color guard and front pit were introduced to the band, keeping with current trends in marching bands around the nation. The 1980s were a huge growth period for the band, not only in quantity, but quality.

In 1999, Mr. David Shaffer was appointed director of the marching band. During Mr. Shaffer's tenure as director, the Marching Band performed at the 2003 Macy's Thanksgiving Day Parade and 2 Football Bowl games. In 2009, he was succeeded by  Dr. Stephen Lytle, who led the band in performances with jazz legend Benny Golson as well as appearances in the 2010 Frozen Four, the 2010 MAC Football Championship, the 2011 GoDaddy.com Bowl, the 2011 Macy's Thanksgiving Day Parade, the 57th Presidential Inaugural Parade, and the 2016 St. Petersburg Bowl. Dr. Brooke Johnson was appointed interim director in 2018 and gained the position of Director of Athletic Bands in 2019.

Instrumentation

The Miami University Marching Band consists of about 270 members, featuring brass, woodwinds, battery, and a pit percussion section. Baton twirlers, a color guard, and a dance team (called the Shakerettes) also perform with the band.

Directors
A.D. Lekvold, 1935-1960
Nicholas Poccia, 1960-1978
Dr. Jack Liles, 1978-1999
David Shaffer, 1999-2009
Dr. Stephen Lytle, 2009-2018
Dr. Brooke Johnson, 2018–present

Notable performances
Every other year, the band travels with the football team to the rival Cincinnati Bearcats to play for the Victory Bell. Additionally, since 2000, MUMB has performed in the following bowl games: the 2003 GMAC Bowl, the 2004 Independence Bowl, the 2010 MAC Championship Game, the 2010 GoDaddy.com Bowl, the 2016 St. Petersburg Bowl, the 2020 LendingTree Bowl, and most recently the 2021 Frisco Football Classic. 

In 2003, the band traveled to New York City to perform in the Macy's Thanksgiving Day Parade, and returned again in 2011. The MUMB also marched in the 2013 Presidential Inaugural Parade on behalf of Ohio, and is a perennial feature in the Indianapolis Bands of America Grand Nationals.

References

External links
 

Mid-American Conference marching bands
Miami University
Musical groups established in 1935
1935 establishments in Ohio